Irina Saratovtseva (born 23 July 1989) is a Kazakhstani footballer who plays as a goalkeeper for SDYUSSHOR №8 and the Kazakhstan women's national team.

Club career
Saratovtseva started her club career in 2002 in the Kazakhstani championship, playing for Akcu Astana and, since 2006, for Alma KTZh, with which she won four championships and made her UEFA Women's Cup debut in 2008.

In 2009, she signed for Zvezda Perm, with which she won the Russian championship and was the reserve goalkeeper in the 2009 UEFA Women's Cup Final.

In 2010, she moved to Spain to play for Sporting Huelva in the Superliga. She left the team in the winter break, and signed for Energiya Voronezh back in Russia. After Energiya renounced to its position in the top championship for financial reasons Saratovtseva signed for second-tier team Alfa-09 Kaliningrad.

In 2013, she returned to Zvezda Perm, this time as a starter.

International career
In 2006, Saratovtseva started playing for the Kazakhstani under-19 national team. She was the first choice goalkeeper of Kazakhstan senior team in the 2011 World Cup qualifiers. She lost her position in the national team through the 2013 Euro qualifiers.

References

1989 births
Living people
Sportspeople from Almaty
Kazakhstani women's footballers
Women's association football goalkeepers
BIIK Kazygurt players
Zvezda 2005 Perm players
Sporting de Huelva players
FC Energy Voronezh players
Primera División (women) players
Kazakhstan women's international footballers
Kazakhstani expatriate footballers
Kazakhstani expatriate sportspeople in Russia
Expatriate women's footballers in Russia
Kazakhstani expatriate sportspeople in Spain
Expatriate women's footballers in Spain
Kazakhstani people of Russian descent